Donald Alexander "Sandy" McGregor (born March 30, 1939) is a Canadian retired professional ice hockey player who played two games in the National Hockey League with the New York Rangers during the 1963–64 season. The rest of his career, which lasted from 1959 to 1969, was spent in the minor leagues.

Career statistics

Regular season and playoffs

References

External links
 

1939 births
Living people
Baltimore Clippers players
Canadian ice hockey right wingers
Guelph Biltmore Mad Hatters players
Kitchener Beavers (EPHL) players
New York Rangers players
Ice hockey people from Toronto
Toronto Marlboros players
Trois-Rivières Lions (EPHL) players